Castell Nadolig ("Christmas Castle") is an Iron Age hillfort, about  east of the village of Aberporth and about  south of the village of Penbryn, in Ceredigion, Wales. It is a scheduled monument. The Penbryn Spoons, of the late Iron Age, were found here.

Description
The fort, sited on a low summit, is next to the A487 road to the south, which here may be the course of an ancient ridgeway.

The space between may have also have served for penning the stock. There are crossbanks between the concentric defences, built in more recent times to create fields.

By the inner rampart on the south-west side, a pool of water marks a prominent rock-cut spring, and there are other springs in nearby fields; these may have influenced the choice of the site.

The hillfort's name is first attributed as 'Kastell Yn Dolig' in a 1571/2 manuscript, and later in 1594 is recorded as ‘Castell Nadolig’, although why this title was chosen for the site is currently not known.

Penbryn Spoons
In 1829, two objects of cast bronze were found by a tenant farmer beneath a heap of stones in the hillfort. Known as the "Penbryn Spoons", they were donated in 1836, by the Rev. Henry Jenkins, to the Ashmolean Museum in Oxford.

From the decoration on the short handles, it is thought that they date from 50 BC to AD 100. One of the spoons has a small hole on one side, and the bowl of the other has an incised cross that divides it into four areas. It is thought that they may have been used for foretelling the future, liquid being poured from the spoon with the hole onto the other spoon. About 25 spoons like these have been found, usually in pairs, in Britain, Ireland and northern France.

See also
 Hillforts in Britain
 List of Scheduled prehistoric Monuments in Ceredigion

References

Hillforts in Ceredigion
Scheduled monuments in Wales